Amable-Paul Coutan (1792–1837) was a French historical painter.

Life
Coutan was born in Paris in 1792. He studied under Gros, and obtaining the Academy pension was thus enabled later on to improve himself at Rome. Returning to his native country he produced works, representing chiefly classical and mythological subjects, which realized considerable prices. He took a part also in the labour of decorating with religious subjects the church of Notre-Dame-de-Lorette. He died in Paris in 1837.

References

Sources
 

1792 births
1837 deaths
19th-century French painters
French male painters
Painters from Paris
Pupils of Antoine-Jean Gros
19th-century French male artists
18th-century French male artists